James J. McDermott Jr. was the former CEO and chairman of Keefe, Bruyette & Woods. He was arrested and charged with insider trading in December 1999 by federal authorities.

McDermott had revealed details about an upcoming merger in 1997 to his lover, Kathryn Gannon. He had been living in Briarcliff Manor, New York with his wife and children. McDermott's lawyers blamed his lapse in judgment on alcohol, depression and family problems. U.S. District Judge Kimba Wood reduced his sentence from 24 months to just 8 months. Although an appeals court overturned McDermott's conviction in 2001, saying his mistress had been unfairly portrayed as a prostitute, McDermott decided against a new trial and instead pleaded guilty to one charge of insider trading. In the end, he lost $25,000 in fines and five months of freedom. He was also barred from working in investment management.

McDermott's family sued him in 2009 on grounds that he had allegedly taken the family trust while his mother was in a nursing home.

References

External links
Profile, nydailynews.com; accessed July 11, 2017.
SEC report
Inside trade by porn star?, December 21, 1999
United States Court of Appeals,Second Circuit. UNITED STATES of America, Appellee, v. James J. McDERMOTT, Jr., Defendant-Appellant, Kathryn B. Gannon, also known as Kathryn B. Gannon Akahoshi, also known as Marylin Star, and Anthony P. Pomponio, Defendants.Docket No. 00-1572.Decided: March 29, 2001.

American financial businesspeople
American white-collar criminals
Living people
People from Briarcliff Manor, New York
Year of birth missing (living people)